Canada competed at the 2022 Winter Paralympics in Beijing, China which took place between 4–13 March 2022.

Para-alpine skier Josh Dueck served as Chef de Mission of the Canadian team and para-alpine skier Karolina Wisniewska was assistant Chef de Mission.

On March 2, 2022, the Canadian Paralympic Committee named wheelchair curler Ina Forrest and para ice hockey player Greg Westlake as Canada's flagbearers during the opening ceremony, the first time that two Canadian athletes will share the role at the Paralympic Games.

Medalists

|  style="text-align:left; width:78%; vertical-align:top;"|

|  style="text-align:left; width:22%; vertical-align:top;"|

Competitors
The following is the list of number of competitors participating at the Games per sport/discipline.

Alpine skiing

Canada qualified a total of 11 alpine skiers (six men and five women). The team was officially named on February 18, 2022. Frédérique Turgeon was expected to complete, but withdrew after sustaining a leg injury during training.

Men

Women

Biathlon

Canada competed in biathlon.

Men

Women

Cross-country skiing

Canada qualified a total of 12 cross-country skiers (seven men and five women). The team was officially named on January 27, 2022. 

Men

Women

Relay

Para ice hockey

Canada qualified a full team of 17 sled hockey players (five men and five women). The team was officially named on February 15, 2022.

Summary

Preliminary round

Semifinal

Final

Snowboarding

Canada qualified a total of four snowboarders (two men and two women). The team was officially named on February 12, 2022.

Banked slalom

Cross

Qualification legend: FA – Qualify to medal round; FB – Qualify to consolation round

Wheelchair curling

Canada has qualified a full team of five curlers.  The team was officially named on January 27, 2022. 

Summary

Round robin

Draw 1
Saturday, March 5, 14:35

Draw 2
Saturday, March 5, 19:35

Draw 4
Sunday, March 6, 14:35

Draw 6
Monday, March 7, 9:35

Draw 8
Monday, March 7, 19:35

Draw 9
Tuesday, March 8, 9:35

Draw 11
Tuesday, March 8, 19:35

Draw 13
Wednesday, March 9, 14:35

Draw 14
Wednesday, March 9, 19:35

Draw 15
Thursday, March 10, 9:35

Semifinal
Friday, March 11, 14:35

Bronze match

See also
Canada at the Paralympics
Canada at the 2022 Winter Olympics

References

Nations at the 2022 Winter Paralympics
2022
Winter Paralympics